This article describes the grammar of the Khmer (Cambodian) language, focusing on the standard dialect.

Word formation
Khmer is primarily an analytic language, with no inflection. There is some derivation by means of prefixes and infixes, but it is no longer always productive, as those elements are often crystallized in words inherited from Old Khmer. Even in Old Khmer, the same affix could have multiple functions (for example, it could serve as a nominalizer in one word and as a causativizer in another).

Word order
Since Khmer is an analytic language, word order is relatively fixed, as changes in word order often affect meaning. Khmer is generally a subject–verb–object (SVO) language. Topicalization is common: the topic of the sentence is often placed at the start, with the rest of the sentence a comment on that topic.

Like in English, prepositions are used rather than postpositions (words meaning "in", "on", etc. precede the noun that they govern). The language is generally head-initial so modifiers come after the words modified (adjectives, possessives, demonstratives, relative clauses, etc. follow nouns; adverbs mostly follow verbs; and so on).

Nouns
Khmer nouns have no grammatical gender or singular/plural inflections. There are no articles, but indefiniteness is often expressed by the word for "one" following the noun. Plurality can be marked by postnominal particles, numerals, or reduplication of a following adjective, which, although it is similar to intensification, is usually differentiated by context:

Possessives are formed by placing the noun or pronoun representing the possessor after the main noun, often with the word   between them. (The word  is also a noun, meaning "thing".)

Numbers and classifiers
In Khmer, a number that indicates quantity follows the noun.

Exceptions include nouns indicating passage of time such as hours or days, units of measurements and currencies, all of which function as noun classifiers without the explicit mention of what is being classified. Reversal of the order can change the meaning:

Classifying particles for use with numerals and nouns exist but are optional, unlike Thai, except in introductory clauses. They are used for clarity or formality, and number precedes classifiers.

The following example illustrates the superfluous mention of what is being classified:

Counting in Khmer is based on a biquinary system (6 to 9 have the form "five one", "five two", etc.) However, the words for multiples of ten from 30 to 90 are not related to the basic Khmer numbers but are probably borrowed from Thai. The Khmer script has its own versions of the Arabic numerals.
 
The principal number words are listed in the following table, which gives Western and Khmer digits, Khmer spelling and IPA transcription:

Intermediate numbers are formed by compounding the above elements. For more information, see Khmer numerals.

Ordinal numbers are formed by placing the particle   before the corresponding cardinal number.

Demonstratives
In Khmer, demonstratives follow the nouns that they modify. In standard literary Khmer, there are two degrees of distance, but there are other distinctions in colloquial language. Demonstratives can also function as articles only after introductory clauses.

Pronouns
The pronominal system is complex and is full of honorific variations.  There is generally no single pronoun appropriate for all situations, with the choice of pronoun based on age, gender, and relationship. Nouns referring to a specific person, like brother or uncle, can be used as pronouns even when one directly addresses the person.

For some examples of typical pronoun forms, see Khmer language – Social registers. Below is a table of the most common kinship terms that are also used as personal pronouns.

Adjectives
Adjectives in Khmer follow the noun; doubling the adjective can indicate plurality or intensify the meaning (see Nouns above). Adjectives follow verbs when they function as adverbs. Adjectives are actually stative verbs and are used without a copula and can be negated, like other verbs.

Comparatives are expressed using the word  /ciəŋ/: "A X /ciəŋ/ [B]" (A is more X [than B]). The most common way to express superlatives is with  /ciəŋ keː/: "A X /ciəŋ keː/" (A is X-est of all).

Reduplication
In Khmer, nouns and adjectives can be reduplicated.  Reduplication can occur as perfect reduplicates or by altering the rhyme of words. Khmer also uses compound reduplication in which two phonologically unrelated words with similar or identical meanings are compounded.

The Khmer script includes the symbol ៗ, which indicates that the preceding word or phrase is to be repeated.

Verbs
As is typical of most East Asian languages, Khmer verbs do not inflect at all; tense and aspect can be expressed using particles (such as កំពុង , placed before a verb to express continuous aspect) and adverbs (such as "yesterday", "earlier", "tomorrow"), or may be understood from context. Serial verb construction is quite common.

Questions
Yes-no questions can be formed by placing the particle  /teː/ at the end of a sentence. This particle can also serve as an emphatic particle (it is also used in negative sentences, as shown below), and so intonation may be required to indicate that a question is being asked.

In wh-questions, the question word generally remains in its usual grammatical position in the sentence, rather than being brought to the start as in English (that is, wh-fronting does not normally take place).

Negation
Verbs can be negated in three primary fashions, all of which convey a slightly different connotation or formality. The most common method of negation is a discontinuous construction placing  "" (not, not to be) before the verb and ending the verb phrase with  "", which, as a stand-alone word can be either "no" or a particle contradicting a previous statement. Colloquially, the final "" may be omitted.

"", as an independent word, means "without" or "lacking" and expresses a similar connotation when used to negate a verb.

A third method is basically identical to the first method except  "" is used instead of "".  This is used only in literary or very formal contexts.

References

External links 
Foreign Service Institute Contemporary Cambodian Grammatical Sketch
Khmer Grammar Checker for OpenOffice
A Student’s Guide to Khmer Grammar

Khmer language
Austroasiatic grammars